Carl Rudolph Frederick "Swede" Anderson IV (September 9, 1898 – April 30, 1978) was an American college football coach at Western Kentucky University and Howard Payne University. Anderson graduated from Centre College in Danville, Kentucky in 1924, where he played in the backfield with legendary alumnus Bo McMillin. Anderson then followed McMillin to Centenary College of Louisiana and Geneva College. Anderson then served one year as the head football coach at Western Kentucky, before moving to Kansas State as its freshman team coach in 1930. Anderson returned to Western Kentucky as its head coach from 1934 to 1937. He was the backfield coach under McMillin at Indiana from 1938 to 1945. He then returned to his alma mater, Centre College, where he coached the Praying Colonels until 1950. The following season, Anderson became the seventh head football coach at the Howard Payne University in Brownwood, Texas and held that position from 1951 to 1952. His coaching record at Howard Payne was 7–10. Anderson died in 1978 of a heart attack, in Oceanside, California.

Head coaching record

See also
 List of college football head coaches with non-consecutive tenure

References

External links
 

1898 births
1978 deaths
American football halfbacks
Centenary Gentlemen football players
Centre Colonels athletic directors
Centre Colonels football coaches
Centre Colonels football players
Geneva Golden Tornadoes football coaches
Geneva Golden Tornadoes football players
Indiana Hoosiers football coaches
Howard Payne Yellow Jackets athletic directors
Howard Payne Yellow Jackets football coaches
Kansas State Wildcats football coaches
Western Kentucky Hilltoppers football coaches
Sportspeople from Fort Worth, Texas